Ana Cristina Sanabria Sánchez (born 2 May 1990) is a Colombian professional racing cyclist, who rides for UCI Women's Continental Team Colombia Tierra de Atletas–GW–Shimano. She won the Colombian National Time Trial Championships four times (from 2015 to 2017 and 2020), and the Vuelta a Colombia Femenina Oro y Paz in 2016 and 2017.

Major results
Source: 

2009
 10th Time trial, National Road Championships
2010
 National Road Championships
2nd Road race
5th Time trial
 8th Overall Vuelta Femenino del Porvenir
2011
 1st  Overall Clasica Alcaldia de Anapoima
1st Stage 2
 3rd Overall Vuelta a Cundinamarca
 4th Overall Vuelta Femenino del Porvenir
 7th Time trial, National Road Championships
2012
 1st  Overall Vuelta a Cundinamarca
1st Stages 2 & 4
 2nd Overall Vuelta Femenino del Porvenir
 National Road Championships
3rd Road race
6th Time trial
2013
 4th Overall Clasica Ciudad de Bogota
 4th Overall Vuelta Femenino del Porvenir
 5th Overall Vuelta a El Salvador
 5th Grand Prix GSB
 10th Road race, National Road Championships
 10th Grand Prix de Oriente
2014
 1st  Overall Vuelta Femenino del Porvenir
1st Stages 4 (ITT) & 5
 4th Overall Clasica Ciudad de Soacha
 5th Time trial, National Road Championships
2015
 National Road Championships
1st  Time trial
3rd Road race
 1st  Overall Vuelta al Oriente Antioqueño
1st Stage 3 (ITT)
 1st  Overall Vuelta Al Tolima
1st Stages 1 & 2
 1st  Overall Clasica Ciudad de Soacha
1st Stage 2
 1st  Overall Vuelta Femenino del Porvenir
1st Stages 2 (ITT) & 4
 2nd Overall Vuelta a Boyacá
 3rd Overall Vuelta al Valle del Cauca
 3rd Overall Vuelta a Cundinamarca
2016
 National Road Championships
1st  Time trial
4th Road race
 1st  Overall Vuelta a Colombia Femenina
1st Stages 1 (ITT) & 4
 1st  Overall Clasica Alcaldia de Anapoima
 1st  Overall Vuelta a Boyacá
1st Stage 2 (ITT)
 1st  Overall Clasica Ciudad de Soacha
1st Stages 1 & 3
 1st  Overall Vuelta Femenino del Porvenir
1st Stage 2
 Pan American Road Championships
2nd  Time trial
7th Road race
 2nd Overall Vuelta a Cundinamarca
 5th Overall Vuelta Al Tolima
 6th Overall Tour Femenino de San Luis
2017
 1st  Time trial, National Road Championships
 1st  Overall Vuelta a Colombia Femenina
1st Prologue, Stages 3 & 5
 1st  Overall Clasica Alcaldia de Anapoima
1st Stage 3
 1st  Overall Vuelta Al Tolima
1st Stages 1 & 2
 1st  Overall Clásica de El Carmen de Viboral
1st Stage 3
 1st  Overall Vuelta Femenino del Porvenir
1st Stages 1 & 4
 1st Stage 1 Vuelta a Cundinamarca
 2nd  Time trial, Bolivarian Games
 4th Time trial, Pan American Road Championships
 8th La Course by Le Tour de France
2018
 South American Games
1st  Road race
1st  Time trial
 1st  Overall Vuelta a Colombia Femenina
1st Stage 3 (ITT)
 1st  Overall Vuelta a Boyacá
1st Stage 3 (ITT)
 2nd  Time trial, Central American and Caribbean Games
 3rd  Time trial, Pan American Road Championships
 3rd Overall Clasica Esteban Chaves
1st Stage 3
2019
 2nd Time trial, National Road Championships
 7th Overall Vuelta a Colombia Femenina
2020
 1st  Time trial, National Road Championships
2021
 2nd Time trial, National Road Championships
2022
 3rd  Road race, Bolivarian Games

References

External links
 
 

1990 births
Living people
Colombian female cyclists
People from Zapatoca
Cyclists at the 2016 Summer Olympics
Olympic cyclists of Colombia
Sportspeople from Santander Department
20th-century Colombian women
21st-century Colombian women
Competitors at the 2018 Central American and Caribbean Games